The leader of the Central Committee of the Chinese Communist Party is the highest-ranking official and head of the Chinese Communist Party (CCP). Since 1982, the leader of the CCP is equivalent to the office of the General Secretary of the Central Committee. Since its formation in 1921, the leader's post has been titled as Secretary of the Central Bureau (1921–1922), Chairman (1922–1925, 1928–1931, and 1943–1982), and General Secretary (1925–1928, 1931–1943, and 1982 onwards).

By custom the party leader has either been elected by the CCP Central Committee or the Central Politburo. There were several name changes until Mao Zedong finally formalized the office of Chairman of the Central Committee. Since 1982, the CCP National Congress and its 1st CC Plenary Session has been the main institutional setting in which the CCP leadership are elected. From 1992 onwards, every party leader has been elected by a 1st CC Plenary Session. In the period 1928–45 the CCP leader was elected by conference, meetings of the Central Committee or by decisions of the Politburo.  The last exception to this rule is Jiang Zemin, who was elected at the 4th Plenary Session of the 13th Central Committee in the aftermath of the 1989 Tiananmen Square protests and massacre. Currently, to be  nominated for the office of general secretary, one has to be a member of the CCP Politburo Standing Committee.

Despite breaching the Constitution of the Chinese Communist Party, several individuals (who are not included in the list) have been de facto leaders of the CCP without holding formal positions of power. Wang Ming was briefly in charge in 1931 after Xiang Zhongfa was jailed by Kuomintang forces, while Li Lisan is considered to have been the real person in-charge for most of Xiang's tenure. Deng Xiaoping is the last CCP official to achieve this; he never served as chairman or general secretary, his highest post being Chairman of the Central Military Commission (commander-in-chief).

Leader offices

Leaders

See also 
List of heads of state of the People's Republic of China
 Leadership core
 Orders of precedence in the People's Republic of China
 List of national leaders of the People's Republic of China

References

Citations

Sources 

 General references
References for when individuals were elected to the CCP leadership offices, the name of the offices and when they established and were abolished are found below:
 
 

 Articles and journal entries
 

 Books
 

 
Leaders of political parties in China
China politics-related lists